The Limpopo River rises in South Africa and flows generally eastward through Mozambique to the Indian Ocean. The term Limpopo is derived from Rivombo (Livombo/Lebombo), a group of Tsonga settlers led by Hosi Rivombo who settled in the mountainous vicinity and named the area after their leader. The Limpopo is the second largest river in Africa that drains to the Indian Ocean, after the Zambezi River.

The first European to sight the river was Vasco da Gama, who anchored off its mouth in 1498 and named it Espirito Santo River. Its lower course was explored by St Vincent Whitshed Erskine in 1868–69, and Captain J F Elton travelled down its middle course in 1870.

The drainage area of Limpopo River has decreased over geological time. Up to Late Pliocene or Pleistocene times, the upper course of the Zambezi River drained into the Limpopo River. The change of the drainage divide is the result of epeirogenic movement that uplifted the surface north of present-day Limpopo River, diverting waters into Zambezi River.

Course 

The river flows in a great arc, first zigzagging north and then north-east, then turning east and finally south-east. At the confluence of the Marico River and the Crocodile River, the name becomes the Limpopo River. There are several rapids as the river falls off Southern Africa's inland escarpment.

The Notwane River is a major tributary of the Limpopo, rising on the edge of the Kalahari Desert in Botswana and flowing in a north-easterly direction. The main tributary of the Limpopo, the Olifants River (Elephant River), contributes around 1,233 million m3 of water per year. Other major tributaries include the Shashe River, Mzingwane River, Crocodile River, Mwenezi River and Luvuvhu River.

In the north-eastern corner of South Africa the river borders the Kruger National Park. The port town of Xai-Xai, Mozambique, is on the river near the mouth. Below the Olifants, the river is navigable to the sea, though a sandbar prevents access by large ships except at high tide.

Tributaries

Basin characteristics 

The waters of the Limpopo flow sluggishly, with considerable silt content. Rudyard Kipling's characterization of the river as the "great grey-green, greasy Limpopo River, all set about with fever-trees," where the "Bi-Coloured Python Rock-Snake" dwells in the Just So Stories is apt. Rainfall is seasonal and unreliable: in dry years, the upper parts of the river flow for 40 days or less. The upper part of the drainage basin, in the Kalahari Desert, is arid but conditions become less arid further downriver. The next reaches drain the Waterberg Massif, a biome of semi-deciduous forest and low-density human population. The fertile lowlands support a denser population, and about 14 million people live in the Limpopo basin. Flooding during the rainy season is an occasional problem in the lower reaches. During February 2000 heavy rainfalls during the passage of a cyclone caused the catastrophic 2000 Mozambique flood.

The highest concentration of hippopotamus in the Limpopo River is found between the Mokolo and the Mogalakwena Rivers. There is a lot of mining activity in the Limpopo River basin with about 1,900 functioning mines, not counting about 1,700 abandoned mines.

History 
Vasco da Gama, on his first expedition, was probably among the first Europeans to sight the river, when he anchored off the mouth in 1498. However, there has been human habitation in the region since time immemorial—sites in the Makapans Valley near Mokopane contain Australopithecus fossils from 3.5 million years ago. St Vincent Whitshed Erskine, later surveyor general for South Africa, traveled to the mouth of the river in 1868–69.

A Zambezi shark was caught hundreds of kilometres upriver at the confluence of the Limpopo and Luvuvhu Rivers in July 1950. Zambezi sharks tolerate fresh water and can travel far up the Limpopo. In 2013, approximately 15,000 Nile crocodiles were accidentally released into the river from flood gates at the nearby Rakwena Crocodile Farm.

Gallery

See also 
Limpopo border gates
Great Limpopo Transfrontier Park
List of international border rivers
Drainage basin A

References

External links 

Climate change implications for water resources in the Limpopo River Basin, study by IFPRI
Green and blue water accounting in the Limpopo and Nile Basins, study by IFPRI
Limpopo Watercourse Commission (LIMCOM) www.limcom.org
Limpopo River Awareness Kit
FROC - Reference frequency of occurrence of fish species in South Africa

 
Rivers of Botswana
Rivers of Zimbabwe
International rivers of Africa
Rivers of Mozambique
Mozambique Channel
Border rivers
Botswana–South Africa border
South Africa–Zimbabwe border
Rivers of North West (South African province)
Rivers of Limpopo